Thomas Roy Southworth (born April 12, 1944 in Washington, D.C.) is an American retired slalom canoeist who competed in the 1960s and 1970s. He won a bronze medal in the mixed C-2 team event at the 1969 ICF Canoe Slalom World Championships in Bourg St.-Maurice. Southworth also finished 12th in the C-2 event at the 1972 Summer Olympics in Munich.

References
Sports-reference.com profile

1944 births
American male canoeists
Canoeists at the 1972 Summer Olympics
Cornell University alumni
Living people
Olympic canoeists of the United States
Medalists at the ICF Canoe Slalom World Championships